The South Korea women's national football team has represented South Korea (Korea Republic) at the FIFA Women's World Cup on three occasions, in 2003, 2015, and 2019.

FIFA Women's World Cup results

*Draws include knockout matches decided on penalty kicks.

Record by opponent

2003 FIFA Women's World Cup

Group B

2015 FIFA Women's World Cup

Group E

Round of 16

2019 FIFA Women's World Cup

Group A

2023 FIFA Women's World Cup

Group H

Goalscorers

References

 
Countries at the FIFA Women's World Cup